is an underground metro station located in Mizuho-ku, Nagoya, Aichi Prefecture, Japan operated by the Nagoya Municipal Subway's Meijō Line. It is located 22.2 kilometers from the terminus of the Meijō Line at Kanayama Station.

History
Horita Station was opened on 30 March 1974.

Lines

 (Station number: M25)

Layout
Horita Station has a single underground island platform.

Platforms

References

External links

 Horita Station official web site 

Railway stations in Aichi Prefecture
Railway stations in Japan opened in 1974
Railway stations in Nagoya